Ankh-Morpork is a fictional city-state which features prominently in Terry Pratchett's Discworld fantasy novels.

Overview
Pratchett describes Ankh-Morpork as the biggest city in Discworld and its corrupt mercantile capital.

In The Art of Discworld, Pratchett explains that the city is similar to Tallinn and central Prague, but adds that it has elements of 18th-century London, 19th-century Seattle and modern-day New York City. He also stated that since the creation of The Streets of Ankh-Morpork, he tried to ensure that the descriptions of character movements and locations in the books matched the Ankh-Morpork map; this allowed him, and fans of the series, to visualise the story more clearly.

Geography
The city itself lies on the River Ankh, the most polluted waterway on the Discworld, which divides it into the more affluent Ankh and the poorer Morpork (including the slum-like "Shades"). Lying approximately equidistant from the cold, mountainous Hub and tropical Rim, Ankh-Morpork is in the Discworld's equivalent of the temperate zone.

Ankh-Morpork is built on black loam, broadly, but it is mostly built on itself; pragmatic citizens simply built on top of the existing buildings rather than excavate them out as the river flooded and the sediment grew too high. There are many unknown basements, including an entire "cave network" below Ankh-Morpork made up of old streets and abandoned sewers.

Politics

Leadership
The succession of the Patrician occurs normally by either assassination or revolution. Patricians have been known to resign, but this is very much the exception. Power is, to some degree, shared with the many Guilds and the surviving nobility. They form a sort of advisory city council, with a system of one man, one vote – the Patrician being the "one man" in question. In The Truth, as per the city charter, a new Patrician must be elected with the unanimous approval of all Guilds.

Institutions
The primary engines of Ankh-Morpork's economy are the Guilds. There are hundreds of Guilds, for every conceivable profession, from clowns to butchers, and each has its own strictly maintained laws and trading practices. Many Guilds have assumed roles which in real-world cities would be assumed by government agencies, such as the Guild of Historians' role comparable to that of English Heritage.

City Watch 

The City Watch is one of the greatest success stories. In the beginning, it consisted of the Day Watch, popinjays headed by Captain "Mayonnaise" Quirke (rich, thick, oily, and smelling slightly of eggs) and the Night Watch, three unemployable men; then-Captain Vimes, who was a drunk, Sergeant Colon, whose idea of major crime would be the theft of a bridge and Corporal Nobbs, who has a certificate to prove that he is probably human. The addition of Lance-Constable Carrot was the catalyst for their reformation over the course of the novel Guards! Guards!.  Over the course of time, the Watch has grown under the leadership of Commander Samuel Vimes to the most modern police force on the Disc.

Assassins' Guild 

The Ankh-Morpork Assassins' Guild is a professional organisation widely considered by the elite to be the best option for a well-rounded education anywhere. The current Patrician, Lord Vetinari, received an Assassins' Guild education in his youth.

The Guild of Assassins is located in a light, airy series of buildings next to the Guild of Fools and Joculators, which, being a far more sinister building, is often mistaken for the Assassins'. The Guild is currently headed by Lord Downey.

History
The Assassins' Guild was founded on 27 August AM1512 by Sir Gyles de Munforte as the de Munforte School for Gentlemen Assassins. Sir Gyles was a warrior knight who, during his crusades in Klatch, was intrigued by the Klatchian tradition of professional gentleman assassins, and decided to set up a similar organisation at home, only without the drugs. In AM1576, the school was elevated to the status of a Guild and the name was changed to the Royal Guild of Assassins. The 'Royal' was dropped after the 'events' of AM1688 (i.e. the Ankh-Morpork Civil War, as a result of which the monarchy was overthrown).

In response to huge demand among the aristocracy for their children to receive the well-rounded education the Guild offered, the Guild's charter was expanded to include those intending to gain skills in proper Assassination.

For most of its history, the Assassins Guild School was a male-only establishment (although talented, self-taught women might become members of the Guild itself); however, it has recently become co-educational.

It is said to be the only school of assassination on the Discworld. However, assassination began in Klatch, and it is stated in Interesting Times that there is a small, very select Guild in Hunghung, in the Agatean Empire.

Currency
The AM$ (Ankh-Morpork dollar) is equal to 100 pennies (pence). Under Ankh-Morporkian tradition, ten pence can be referred to as a shilling, twenty-five pence as half a ton, and fifty pence as a nob/a ton/half a bar/a knocker.

The AM$ is reputedly the hardest currency outside of the Agatean Empire. A dollar coin is the size of a Venetian sequin, and although theoretically made of gold the metal has been adulterated so many times that, according to The Discworld Companion:

In Making Money, Moist von Lipwig, as deputy chairman of the Royal Mint of Ankh-Morpork (acting under authority of the actual chairman, a small dog named Mr. Fusspot), sought to take Ankh-Morpork off of the gold standard and make the Ankh-Morpork dollar a fiat currency backed by the economy of the city. And, inspired by the trend of Ankh-Morpork citizens using stamps as currency, von Lipwig introduces banknotes for multi-dollar denominations, with the five-dollar note possibly incorporating imps as an anti-forgery measure.

Real-world connections

Ankh-Morpork was twinned with the town of Wincanton in Somerset, in the south-west United Kingdom on the spherical planet Earth (known in the Discworld books as Roundworld) on 7 December 2002. The town is home to a shop called "The Discworld Emporium", which also doubles as an "Ankh-Morpork Consulate" according to the shop sign. However, due to legal reasons, the twinning was not officially displayed on the road sign. Fans, however, added stick-on notices to some of the signs. In 2009, this was changed, and a new town sign prominently declaring the twinning with Ankh-Morpork and other Roundworld places was erected. This sign was designed by the Cunning Artificer himself, Bernard Pearson (of the Discworld Emporium). Several streets in a new housing development in Wincanton have been named after Ankh-Morpork Streets, including Peach Pie Street and Treacle Mine Road.

The word "Morpork" is from a type of New Zealand owl called the morepork, which is depicted holding the ankh on the coat of arms.

"Discworld: Ankh-Morpork" was published as a board game in 2011.

Fiction connections
Many details of Ankh-Morpork appear to have been inspired by Fritz Leiber's fictional city Lankhmar (although Pratchett has said "I didn't – at least consciously, I suppose I must say – create Ankh-Morpork as a takeoff of Lankhmar"); John D. Rateliff notes that Leiber's characters "the Gray Mouser and Fafhrd guest-star in the very first Discworld story, The Colour of Magic, under the pseudonyms of The Weasel and Bravd".

Notes

References
Pratchett, Terry (1983). The Colour of Magic. Colin Smythe.
Pratchett, Terry (1989). Guards! Guards!. Gollancz.
Pratchett, Terry & Briggs, Stephen (1993). The Streets of Ankh-Morpork. Corgi.
Pratchett, Terry (1993). Men At Arms. Gollancz.
Pratchett, Terry (1996). Feet of Clay. Gollancz.
Pratchett, Terry (1997). Jingo. Gollancz.
Pratchett, Terry (2000). The Truth. Gollancz.
Pratchett, Terry (2002). Night Watch. Gollancz.
Pratchett, Terry & Briggs, Stephen (2003). The Discworld Companion (3rd ed.). Gollancz.
Pratchett, Terry & Pearson, Bernard (2004). The Discworld Almanak. Doubleday.
Pratchett, Terry & Kidby, Paul (2004). The Art of Discworld . Gollancz.
Pratchett, Terry (2004). Going Postal. Doubleday.
Pratchett, Terry (2005). Thud!. Doubleday.
Pratchett, Terry & June (2007). Making Money. Corgi.

External links
 Discworld & Pratchett Wiki
 The L-Space Web, possibly the definitive Discworld web site
 Ankh-Morpork Anthem, performed by the BBC Scottish Symphony Orchestra.

Discworld locations
Fictional city-states
Fictional elements introduced in 1983

de:Figuren und Schauplätze der Scheibenwelt-Romane#Ankh-Morpork